The Mexico Ledger is the only daily newspaper published in Mexico, Missouri, United States and the surrounding rural area.  The current owner is the Westplex Media Group, who purchased the paper from Gannett in 2020.

Although it primarily serves the city of Mexico, the Ledger also covers news and local events in Audrain, Monroe, Montgomery, and Callaway Counties.

See also
 Pendleton Dudley - former reporter

References

Newspapers published in Missouri
Audrain County, Missouri
Publications established in 1856
1856 establishments in Missouri